3 Days to Eternity is a 2007 Indonesian adult comedy-drama film directed by Riri Riza. The story is about a young man and a woman who drive from Jakarta to Jogjakarta. During the trip they discover many things and discuss sex, marriage and religion.

The film had a successful run at several international film festivals, winning best direction (Riri Riza) at the Brussels International Independent Film Festival 2008 and best Indonesian film at the Jakarta International Film Festival 2007.

Cast 
 Tutie Kirana
 Ringgo Agus Rahman
 Nicholas Saputra
 Adinia Wirasti
 Angelo Bondoc

References

External links 
 

2007 films
2000s Indonesian-language films
2007 comedy-drama films
Films shot in Indonesia
2000s sex comedy films
2000s road comedy-drama films
Films about sexuality
Indonesian sex comedy films
Indonesian road comedy-drama films
Films directed by Riri Riza